Yeonpo-tang or yeonpo-guk is a Korean soup made with beef, radish, tofu, and kelp stock.

In South Jeolla Province, a different soup called yeonpo-tang is made with long arm octopus. The local specialty, octopus soup, may also be called nakji-yeonpo-tang ("octopus yeonpo-tang") outside the province.

Preparation 
Nakji-yeonpo-tang can be prepared by boiling long arm octopus in kelp stock, taking the octopus out, slicing them into bite-sized pieces and putting them back into the soup. The soup is usually seasoned with salt, minced garlic, sliced tree onions, sesame oil, and ground toasted sesame seeds, and is boiled together with the slices of octopus.

See also 

 List of seafood dishes
 List of soups

References 

Funeral food and drink
Korean soups and stews
Octopus dishes
Tofu dishes